This article contains a list of Mayors of Hattiesburg, Mississippi, United States.

History
Hattiesburg was incorporated as a town in 1884 and as a city in 1890. The initial governing structure included a mayor and eight aldermen until 1911 when Hattiesburg adopted a city commission form of government with a mayor and two commissioners, the first of its kind in the state. Since 1985, Hattiesburg has operated under a mayor-council government with the city split into five wards, each with a single councilmember.

List of mayors

References

Source
Hattiesburg Municipal Records The University of Southern Mississippi – McCain Library and Archives

 
Hattiesburg, Mississippi